Hugh McVay (April 29, 1766 – May 9, 1851) was the ninth governor of the U.S. state of Alabama from July 17 to November 30, 1837. He was born in South Carolina.

Early career
McVay moved from South Carolina to the Territory of Mississippi and represented Madison County in the Alabama Legislature from 1811 to 1818. He then moved to Lauderdale County and represented Lauderdale County in the 1819 Alabama Constitutional Convention. McVay lived in the community of Mars Hill, Alabama and is buried there.

Alabama Congress
McVay was in the Alabama House of Representatives from 1820 to 1825. He then served in the Alabama State Senate from 1825 to 1844.

Governor of Alabama
McVay was elected Speaker of the Senate in 1836 and became acting governor of Alabama in 1837 when Governor Clement C. Clay was appointed to the United States Senate. McVay served as governor from July 17, 1837, to November 30, 1837, when Governor Arthur P. Bagby took office.

Weblinks

References

1766 births
1851 deaths
People from South Carolina
Governors of Alabama
American Presbyterians
Democratic Party governors of Alabama